An Indian colony is a Native American settlement associated with an urban area. Although some of them become official Indian reservations, they differ from most reservations in that they are placed where Native Americans could find employment in mainstream American economy. Many were originally formed without federal encouragement or sanction.

Locations and establishment
Indian colonies are especially common in Nevada.  As the Great Basin ecosystem is very fragile, native lifeways became untenable soon after white settlement due to livestock over-grazing, water diversions and the felling of Pinyon pine groves.  At that time there were few official reservations in the area, and those were terribly run even by contemporary standards.  Many Native Americans chose instead to seek jobs in white ranches, farms and cities.  The areas in which they settled became known as Indian Camps or Colonies.  In some cases they owned the land they settled on, in other cases they settled on public land.  Starting in the early twentieth century, the federal government began establishing Indian trust territories for the colonies on public land. 

Following the Indian Reorganization Act of 1934, many of the Indian colonies gained federal recognition as tribes.  Many of the tribes formed this way are unusual in that they include members from different nations.  For example, the Reno-Sparks Indian Colony has members with Washoe, Paiute and Shoshone heritage.

Examples
The following is an incomplete list of Indian Colonies in the United States:

See also

Indian reservation
Urban Indian reserve, Canada
Ranchería
Rancherie, Canada
Oklahoma Tribal Statistical Area
Tampa Indian Reservation
Urban Indian

References

ı

Indigenous peoples of the Great Basin
Native American populated places
American Indian reservations
Lands inhabited by indigenous peoples
Ethnic enclaves in the United States
Decolonization